Urte is a female first name occurring mainly in Germany.

Origin and meaning of the name

The origin and meaning of Urte is uncertain, but there are at least six theories:
 It comes from Baltic and means handy with a sword
 It is a Basque form of Ruth
 It is from the Danish word for herbs
 It is a modification of Urd
 It is a Baltic short form of Dorothea
 It is a short form of Ortrud

Given names

 Urte Blankenstein (Actress; see :de:Urte Blankenstein and http://imdb.com/name/nm1779155/)
 Urte Juodvalkyte (Lithuanian road cyclist)
 Urte Kazakeviciute (Lithuania swimmer)
 Urte Pautz (Author and academic; see https://www.amazon.ca/s?ie=UTF8&search-type=ss&index=books-ca&field-author=Urte%20Pautz&page=1)
 Urte Sejûnaite (Actress; see https://www.imdb.com/name/nm1991570/)

Other instances
Urte is also a common noun in Basque meaning "year":
 Urte ilunak (Movie; see https://www.imdb.com/title/tt0105705/)
 25 Kantu Urte (Album of songs recorded in 1996 by the Basque group Oskorri; see http://www.rambles.net/oskorri_25kantu96.html)

See also 
 http://www.baby-vornamen.de/Maedchen/U/Ur/Urte/

Given names